Developing Solutions, Inc. was an independent software vendor (ISV) that provided application and network test products.  Privately held, and headquartered in  the Dallas-Fort Worth metroplex, Developing Solutions served telecommunications service providers and original equipment manufacturers (OEM).

Products

In 2009, the company announced dsTest, a software-based system for testing network interfaces and features in the core packet network for 3G, 4G, and 5G wireless networks.  In 2013, it announced dsAnalyzer, a software product for analyzing traffic flows between wireless core packet network nodes and for automating dsTest test case generation.

dsTest has been used to test vendor network equipment by an independent testing organization.

Acquisition
On 22 June 2021 it was announced that Developing Solutions had been acquired by long-standing partner Mobileum. Terms were not disclosed.

References

External links
 Official site
 Biju, Issac and Nauman, Israr (2015) Case Studies in Secure Computing: Achievements and Trends, October 19, 2016 by Auerbach Publications, ; Section 18.3.2.2 “Testing”, page 379
 Broadband Traffic Management January 2, 2012

Telecommunications companies of the United States
Companies based in McKinney, Texas